Global Deejays, Global Playboyz or Ravers on Dope are an Austrian tech house DJ team composed of DJ Taylor (Konrad Schreyvogl) and FLOw (Florian Schreyvogl). Their first three singles were big hits in Europe.

Musical career
The group's track "The Sound of San Francisco" partially samples the 1967 (The Summer of Love) song "San Francisco (Be Sure to Wear Flowers in Your Hair)" sung by Scott McKenzie. The video includes scenes of the band in a decorated school bus driving through popular destinations.

In 2005 the Global Deejays won both the Russian MTV Energy Award and the Polish ESKA Award.

In 2008 DJ Mikkel (Mikkel Christensen) left the team.

January 26, 2009 saw the remixed version of the group's "Everybody's Free (To Feel Good)" debut on the Australian ARIA Charts at number 33 (eventually hitting #7). This popularity was the result of the track featuring in television commercials for the Australian version of So You Think You Can Dance that summer.

April 2010 saw the Global Deejays release "My Friend" with the vocal talents of Danish singer Ida Corr.

April 2011 saw the Global Deejays' release "Bring It Back" reach #8 in the official US Billboard Dance chart. The track features Niels Van Gogh, and the vocals of house diva, Terri B!
aka Terri Bjerre.

January 2012 saw the Global Deejays' cover of Dune "Hardcore Vibes" peak at #46 on the French Top 100.

Discography

Albums

Singles / Maxis

References

External links
 Discogs information on Global Deejays
 Global Deejays homepage
 Guitar Tab of Kids

Austrian Eurodance groups
Austrian DJs
House music groups
Austrian house music groups
Austrian pop music groups
Musical groups established in 2004